Neoschoenobia pandora is a moth of the family Crambidae. It was described by Edward Meyrick in 1910. It is found in New Zealand.

References

 Eranistis pandora in insectin

Moths described in 1910
Acentropinae
Taxa named by Edward Meyrick